Glenfern may refer to:
 Glenfern, Queensland, Australia, locality near Kilcoy
 Glenfern, Tasmania, Australia, locality in the Derwent Valley
 Glenfern House in St Kilda East, Victoria, Australia
 Glenfern Sanctuary Regional Park in New Zealand's Hauraki Gulf
 "Glenfern", song on Kathleen Edwards' 2020 album Total Freedom
 Livezey House in Philadelphia, Pennsylvania, also known as Glen Fern